Randal John Metz (born April 24, 1959) is a professional puppeteer and variety/stage performer.  He is known for creating puppet productions, and puppet performer for Children’s Fairyland’s Open Storybook Puppet Theater in Oakland, California,  the oldest continuously operating puppet theater in the United States.  He currently produces seven different puppet shows a year for the theater,  and tours his shows throughout California under the name The Puppet Company. He has served several terms as President and Vice-President of the San Francisco Bay Area Puppeteers Guild.

Early life 
Metz was born in Castro Valley, California and grew up in Oakland and San Leandro, California.  He began his puppetry career at the age of 10 when he visited Children’s Fairyland in Oakland and saw Lewis Mahlmann’s puppet production of Treasure Island, and decided immediately that he wanted to be a puppeteer.

His first contact with Children’s Fairyland came as a child actor at the park. There was a tradition at the park to have children compete for roles as Alice in Wonderland characters.  Metz won the role of the Mad Hatter.  After a year, he stayed on as a volunteer to be close to the puppet theater. He apprenticed to Mahlmann, along with John Gilkerson, Tom Royer, Paul Kennemore and Michael Earl Davis.  Metz studied acting, directing and theater at Chabot College in Hayward, California and San Francisco State University in San Francisco, California   graduating Cum laude in 1985 with a BA in Theater Arts.

Career 
Metz trained professionally with Mahlmann from 1970–2014.  In 1991 Metz and Mahlmann became M Plus M Productions, and co-directed the puppet theater until 2006 at which time Metz became the sole director.

Metz has also studied puppetry with Lettie Connell Schubert who is known for her television puppet performances of the 1950s on the Brother Buzz show and Looking Glass Lady. He also attended personal classes taught by Jerry Juhl, the head writer for The Muppets.

In 1979 he joined with puppeteer Tom Royer to create The Puppet Company. The two performed from 1979–1980 at the Oakland Zoo (then known as Knowland Park Zoo).  A special small amphitheater was constructed for their performances.

In 1985 he directed Oakland’s Vagabond Puppets, a city-sponsored touring show. The program, created in 1948 has included  as directors Lettie Connell Schubert, Bruce Chessé, Blake Maxam, Jerry Juhl and Frank Oz.

From 1985 – 1989, Metz studied with marionette artist Bob Baker, of The Bob Baker Marionette Theater in Los Angeles, California. Metz learned the art of creating and performing variety-show marionettes. 1987 – 1988, Metz was employed on two nationwide tours with The Big John Strong Circus, presenting large variety marionettes in a circus setting. In 1994 Metz was selected to participate in the Survey of Puppet Theater Techniques, taught by The Muppets performers, an intensive two week puppetry course.

Metz has trained four apprentices who have gone on to successful puppetry careers: Rhonda Godwin, his puppetry partner since 2000, Kevin Menegus, Jesse Vail, and Evy Wright.

When not working in the puppet world, Randal has acted with several Bay Area theaters, and has directed several plays.  His company also teaches classes in puppetry and create puppet and prop rentals for stage musicals and dramas such as Little Shop of Horrors, Avenue Q, and Carnival!. He has performed as puppeteer with the San Francisco Chamber Orchestra and other musical associations.

In 2016, Metz received a Mayoral Proclamation from then city Mayor Libby Schaff honoring him for 47 years of artistic service to puppetry, Children's Fairyland, and the city of Oakland, by declaring August 27, 2016 "Randal Metz Day in Oakland."(12)

Metz has served at Fairyland as a child entertainer, ride operator, recreation specialist, event planner, children's theater director, artistic director, puppeteer and historian.(13)

Personal life
In 1989 Randal married Dawn Graves, a long-time friend and fellow employee at Fairyland. They worked as a team in the circus and on the variety stage. After three years, they decided to separate and pursue different endeavors.

Bibliography
 Metz, Randal (2003). Storybook Strings — 50 Years of Puppetry at Children’s Fairyland’s Storybook Puppet Theater. Oakland, California. Rappid Rabbit Publishing 
 Metz, Randal; Jonick, Tony (2011). Creating a Fairyland — 60 Years of Magic at Children’s Fairyland U.S.A.  Oakland, California. Rappid Rabbit Publishing 
 Metz, Randal (2012). Making Puppets The Fairyland Way. Vancouver, British Columbia. Charlemagne Press 
 Metz, Randal (2016). Children’s Fairyland (Images of America). Charleston, South Carolina. Arcadia Press

References

External links 
 Children’s Fairyland
  San Francisco Bay Area Puppeteers Guild

American puppeteers
Entertainers from California
1959 births
People from Oakland, California
Living people
Chabot College alumni
San Francisco State University alumni